Hometown Flex is a South Korean television program that airs on tvN, every Sunday at 22:50 (KST) starting from July 12 to September 20, 2020.

Overview
A "hardcore local variety" show in which two "Seoul Bumpkins" (Cha Tae-hyun, Lee Seung-gi), who have only lived in Seoul all their lives, travel outside Seoul, and experience life outside Seoul by going on local tours guided by celebrities who were born and raised in their hometowns.

Episodes (2020)

Notes

References

External links 
 Official website 

South Korean reality television series
2020 South Korean television series debuts
2020 South Korean television series endings
TVN (South Korean TV channel) original programming
Korean-language television shows